The UTSA Roadrunners football statistical leaders are individual statistical leaders of the UTSA Roadrunners football program in various categories, including passing, rushing, receiving, total offense, defensive stats, kicking, and scoring. Within those areas, the lists identify single-game, single-season and career leaders. As of the upcoming 2023 season, the Roadrunners represent the University of Texas at San Antonio in the NCAA Division I FBS American Athletic Conference.

UTSA began competing in intercollegiate football in 2011. Therefore, the Roadrunners do not have the typical issues with statistical leaderboards like these -- there is no era from the early 20th century in which complete records do not exist. On the other hand, players appearing on these lists often have relatively low statistic totals because the team has not yet existed long enough for many players to produce big numbers.

Recordkeeping notes:
 Since UTSA did not start football competition until 2011, it was not affected by the NCAA's practice of not counting statistics amassed in FBS bowl games, or playoff games in Division I FCS, toward official season statistics until 2002. UTSA did not qualify for the FCS playoffs in its first season in 2011, which was its only season of FCS playoff eligibility. In 2012, it began its transition to FBS, completing it in advance of the 2014 season. Since becoming eligible for bowl games in 2014, the Roadrunners have played in four bowl games, giving players in those seasons an extra game to amass statistics.
 Conference USA, in which UTSA was a member from 2013 to 2022, has held a championship game since 2005. UTSA played in (and won) the game in 2021 and 2022, giving players in those seasons yet another game to amass statistics.
 Due to COVID-19 issues, the NCAA ruled that the 2020 season would not count against the athletic eligibility of any football player, giving everyone who played in that season the opportunity for five years of eligibility instead of the normal four.

These lists are updated through the 2022 season. Players expected to be active in the 2023 season are in bold type.

Passing

Passing yards

Passing touchdowns

Rushing

Rushing yards

Rushing touchdowns

Receiving

Receptions

Receiving yards

Receiving touchdowns

Total offense
Total offense is the sum of passing and rushing statistics. It does not include receiving or returns.

Total offense yards

Touchdowns responsible for
"Touchdowns responsible for" is the official NCAA term for combined passing and rushing touchdowns.

Defense

Interceptions

Tackles

Sacks

Kicking

Field goals made

Field goal percentage

Scoring

Points

Touchdowns
In official NCAA statistics, touchdown totals include touchdowns scored. Accordingly, these lists include rushing, receiving, and return touchdowns, but not passing touchdowns.

Footnotes

References

Lists of college football statistical leaders by team